The Association of National Olympic Committees (ANOC) is an international organization that affiliates the current 206 National Olympic Committees (NOCs) recognized by the International Olympic Committee (IOC). Each year it gathers all its members at the ANOC General Assembly, in which the ANOC Awards are awarded to NOCs and their athletes since 2014. The association organises the ANOC World Beach Games, a multi-sport event held every two years.

History
The ANOC was established in June 1979 during the Constitutive General Assembly in San Juan, Puerto Rico. The organization's purpose is for the IOC to manage the general affairs for the National Olympic Committees, to give them their support, advice, cooperation, and recommendations for their development.

Members
Its members are affiliated to one of five continental associations:

The organization was founded in 1979 under the presidency of Mario Vázquez Raña of Mexico. Since 2012, Sheikh Ahmad Al-Fahad Al-Sabah of Kuwait has served as the ANOC president. He self-suspended himself in November 2018 and Robin Mitchell was elected ANOC President on October 20, 2022.

ANOC Presidents

ANOC General Assembly
The ANOC General Assembly is the general meeting of the members of ANOC, held once a year in which each member has one vote. It is ANOC's supreme governing body and its decisions are final. The Assembly elects the President and the Senior Vice-President every four years, as well as the members of the Executive Council.

ANOC Awards
Since 2014, the Association of National Olympic Committees (ANOC) has given awards to the best athletes of the year. Traditionally, on even years, the ANOC Awards recognise achievements from the previous Olympic Games while on the odd years, the ceremony is dedicated to achievements from recent Continental Games or International Federation World Championships. The winners are selected from a shortlist presented to a jury by the Continental Olympic Associations.

References

External links
 Official website

International sports bodies based in Switzerland

Sports organizations established in 1979
Organisations based in Lausanne
Olympic organizations
1979 establishments in Puerto Rico